The India International Film Festival (IIFF) of Tampa Bay takes place annually in Tampa, Florida.  IIFF's mission is to provide "a platform for increased awareness of Indian cinema and culture to the community by promoting films and industry professionals representing the diversity of India."  The films featured at the festival include feature films, short films, and documentaries that are produced by Indians, films with Indian actors or actresses, or films with Indian themes.  The festival takes place over the course of three days and includes a red carpet, Indian food, and various entertainment, including music and dance performances.

The fourth annual festival took place February 15, 2013 to February 17, 2013.

History 
IIFF was founded by Francis Vayalumkal, Rahul Korlipara, and Rachna Dinkar 
in February, 2010.  It was originally sponsored by the Indo-US Chamber of Commerce.

There were approximately 3,000 attendees in 2012, 2,500 attendees in 2011, and 1,000 attendees in 2010.

2013 Film Screenings

2012 Film Screenings

2011 Film Screenings

2010 Film Screenings

Film School 
IIFF was the first South Asian Film Festival in the United States to hold an independent film school for aspiring filmmakers.  It was started in 2012.

References

External links 
 India International Film Festival http://iifftampa.com
 Indo-US Chamber of Commerce http://www.indo-us.org

Film festivals in Florida
Indian film festivals
Tourist attractions in Tampa, Florida
2010 establishments in Florida
Film festivals established in 2010
Festivals in Tampa, Florida
Indian-American culture in Florida